David A. Webster Jr. (July 23, 1937 – June 23, 2006) in Atlanta, Texas, was a professional American football cornerback who played two seasons for that American Football League's Dallas Texans, 1960–1961.  He was an All-AFL selection in 1961.

Early years
David was the son of David A. Webster Sr. and Eunice (Harper) Webster.  He lived in Atlanta, Texas, until he was 13 years old, when he moved to Houston with his mother.  He was educated in the Atlanta Public Schools, Holy Cross Lutheran schools and Jack Yates High School.

He attended Yates High School in Houston and graduated as the valedictorian of his class.  He also helped his Yates team to a city championship and a state championship in football as the starting quarterback.

College career

After Yates, David attended Prairie View A&M University on an academic scholarship, where he played tennis and football for College Football Hall of Fame coach Billy Nicks.

During his tenure at Prairie View A&M University David:
Led his football team to black college football national championship in 1958
All-SWAC (Southwestern Athletic Conference) in 1958 & 1959
SWAC tennis doubles champions with Clifton Johnson in 1959
Was an All-American quarterback in 1958
Was a member of Prairie View Panthers Club

AFL career
In 1960, "Can Head", as he came to be known by close friends and teammates, was drafted to play football for the Dallas Texans under Pro Football Hall of Fame owner Lamar Hunt and coach Hank Stram.  The Dallas Texans later became the Kansas City Chiefs in 1963 when the franchise moved from Texas to Missouri.  Even though David was an All-American quarterback in college, he played defensive back because blacks were not allowed to play the quarterback position in the professional football ranks at that time.  He paved the way by overcoming racial injustice and adversity as one of the first blacks to play professional football for the American Football League and he was one of two black players on the Texans/Chiefs (in those days, there was a "two blacks per team" quota in effect).  Despite the circumstances, he led the team in interceptions and became an AFL All-Pro defensive back in 1961.  His career came to an abrupt end when his leg was broken in a pre-season game in 1962; the Texans went on to win the AFL championship.

After football
After graduating from Prairie View A&M University's School of Engineering with a BS in Electrical Engineering in 1962, he worked for the Bendix Corporation in Kansas City, Missouri.  In 1971, David moved to Michigan to work for Ford Motor Company.  While at Ford, he earned a Masters of Business Administration (MBA) from Central Michigan University in 1975.  In 2001, David retired from Ford Motor Company and in 2004 he moved back home to Texas from Michigan to become a farmer again.

See also
List of American Football League players

External links
Prairie View A&M University Sports Hall of Fame
https://web.archive.org/web/20071201130326/http://www.armchairgm.com/Dave_Webster
Prairie View Interscholastic League Tennis Records
Most Defensive Touchdowns in a Season
Longest Interception Return (All TD's)
AFL All-Star and Pro Bowl Selection
NAIA Players in the Pros
Kansas City Chiefs Encyclopedia by Mark Stallard
Outside the Lines By Charles K. Ross

1937 births
2006 deaths
People from Atlanta, Texas
American football cornerbacks
Prairie View A&M Panthers football players
Dallas Texans (AFL) players
American Football League All-Star players
American Football League All-League players
Bendix Corporation people